Andrzej Śrzedrzyński (died 1654) was a Roman Catholic prelate who served as Auxiliary Bishop of Lviv (1641–1654) and Titular Bishop of Nicopolis in Epiro (1641–1654).

Biography
On 16 Sep 1641, Andrzej Śrzedrzyński was appointed during the papacy of Pope Urban VIII as Auxiliary Bishop of Lviv and Titular Bishop of Nicopolis in Epiro. 
He served as Auxiliary Bishop of Lviv until his death in 1654.

References

External links and additional sources
 (for Chronology of Bishops) 
 (for Chronology of Bishops)  
 (for Chronology of Bishops) 

1654 deaths
17th-century Roman Catholic bishops in the Polish–Lithuanian Commonwealth
Bishops appointed by Pope Urban VIII